Yuichi Kubo (久保 裕一, born September 26, 1988) is a Japanese footballer who plays for Fagiano Okayama, as a striker for SC Sagamihara.

Club statistics
Updated to 23 February 2018.

References

External links

Profile at SC Sagamihara

1988 births
Living people
Meiji University alumni
Association football people from Wakayama Prefecture
Japanese footballers
J2 League players
J3 League players
JEF United Chiba players
Gainare Tottori players
Fagiano Okayama players
Mito HollyHock players
SC Sagamihara players
Association football forwards